This P. T. Deutermann bibliography is a list of books written by P. T. Deutermann, except collections, ebooks, and non-novels.

Complete list of works in chronological order
Note: + denotes a book in the Cam Richter series.

References

External links
 

Bibliographies by writer
Bibliographies of American writers
Mystery fiction bibliographies